Aravan (c. 483 BC) was a legendary ruler of Armenia, mentioned in the 5th century AD History of Armenia. He was the youngest son of Vahagn, and ruled for 18 years.

References

Armenian royalty
Legendary Armenian people